Cheon Ju-hyeon (born 28 February 1977) is a South Korean speed skater. He competed in two events at the 1998 Winter Olympics.

References

1977 births
Living people
South Korean male speed skaters
Olympic speed skaters of South Korea
Speed skaters at the 1998 Winter Olympics
Place of birth missing (living people)
Asian Games medalists in speed skating
Speed skaters at the 1999 Asian Winter Games
Medalists at the 1999 Asian Winter Games
Asian Games silver medalists for South Korea
Asian Games bronze medalists for South Korea
21st-century South Korean people
20th-century South Korean people